Kemal Arıkan  (1927–1982) was a Turkish diplomat assassinated by two US citizens of Armenian origin in Los Angeles, United States.

Early life
He was born on 1927 in İskilip, Çorum Province. After completing his education at Ankara University, Law School and Harvard University, he began serving in Turkish government offices. In 1955 he transferred to the Ministry of Foreign Affairs. He was married and had two children.

Professional life
While working with the Ministry of Foreign Affairs, he served at the embassies in Prague, Chicago, Canberra and Sydney, in addition to various offices in Turkey. In 1978 he was appointed as the consul general in Los Angeles. Los Angeles had become a critical location for Turkish representatives, after another consul general, Mehmet Baydar, and vice consul, Bahadır Demir, were assassinated there in 1973. Arıkan left his two children in Canberra, Australia, which was one of his former places of duty. In an interview with the Los Angeles Times, he was asked about the risks of living in Los Angeles, and responded by saying, "you take precautions."

Assassination
On 28 January 1982, at about 9:30 am, Arıkan was driving from his home to his office. When he stopped at a red stoplight, two armed men began shooting at him. He was hit 14 times. The two men were Harry Sassounian (also known as Hampig Sassounian) and Krikor Saliba. Although Saliba disappeared without a trace, Sassounian was arrested, and in 1984 he was sentenced to life imprisonment without parole.

In 2002, prosecutors agreed to drop the so-called "national origin" special circumstance of the case, making Sassounian eligible for parole, in exchange for his admitting his guilt and formally apologizing. Sassounian said, "I participated in the murder of Kemal Arikan. I renounce the use of terrorist tactics to achieve political goals. I regret the suffering of the Arıkan family." The California Prison Parole Board denied Sassounian's parole in 2006, 2010 and 2013. On 14 December 2016, the California Board of Parole granted parole for Sassounian. Turkey's Ministry of Foreign Affairs condemned the decision of his release and Turkish American groups urged California Governor Jerry Brown to deny parole. Brown denied the parole in May 2017, vetoing the board's decision. In a statement, Brown said he believes Sassounian would still pose "an unreasonable danger to society if released," adding that "The killing was a deliberate, planned assassination of a diplomat, plotted at least two weeks in advance." In 2020, the denial of Sassounian's parole was reversed by a court in Los Angeles. Governor Gavin Newsom decided not to appeal the change, and Sassounian was released from prison in 2020. He moved to Armenia in 2021.

References

1927 births
1982 deaths
People from İskilip
Ankara University alumni
Harvard University alumni
Deaths by firearm in California
Terrorist attacks attributed to Armenian militant groups
Turkish people murdered abroad
Assassinated Turkish diplomats
Assassinated Turkish civil servants
Burials at Aşiyan Asri Cemetery